Paul Roscoe Stillman (1871–1945) was a clinical researcher in the field of periodontology.  He was the first to define occlusal trauma in 1917.

References

External links
 

1871 births
1945 deaths
Periodontists